Carol Levine is a home health-care advocate and the Director of the Families and Health Care Project of the United Hospital Fund.

Career 
In 1991, she founded The Orphan Project: Families and Children in the HIV Epidemic. From 1987 to 1991, she was the director of the Citizens Commission on AIDS in New York City. She is a fellow of the Hastings Center, an independent bioethics research institution.

Levine is the editor of Always on Call: When Illness Turns Families into Caregivers, The Cultures of Caregiving, and Living in the Land of Limbo.

Awards
 1993 MacArthur Fellows Program
 2009 Purpose Prize Fellow

Works
 "President Obama’s Groundbreaking Order on Hospital Visitation and Decision-making", Bioethics Forum, 19 April 2010
 The Cultures of Caregiving: Conflict and Common Ground Among Families, Health Professionals, and Policy Makers, Editors Carol Levine, Thomas H. Murray, JHU Press, 2004, 
 Always on Call: When Illness Turns Families into Caregivers, United Hospital Fund of New York, 2000, 
 A generation at risk: the global impact of HIV/AIDS on orphans and vulnerable children, Editors Geoff Foster, Carol Levine, John Williamson, Cambridge University Press, 2005, 
 "AIDS and the Ethics of Human Subjects Research", AIDS & ethics, Editor Frederic G. Reamer, Columbia University Press, 1991,

References

American health activists
Living people
MacArthur Fellows
Year of birth missing (living people)
Hastings Center Fellows
Cornell University alumni